The Tulane Green Wave football team, representing Tulane University in the sport of American football since 1893, has had 19 players named first-team All-Americans. This includes two players who earned the distinction twice, and one player who was a unanimous selection.

First Team All-Americans

References

Tulane Green Wave
Tulane Green Wave football All-Americans